Marysburg is a hamlet in Saskatchewan located along Highway 756.  The hamlet is an un-incorporated place within the Rural Municipality of Humboldt.  It is located 16 k (10 miles) north of Humboldt.

History
From January 1, 1904 until May 1, 1924 it was referred to as Dead Moose Lake.

Attractions
The hamlet is home to one municipal heritage property, the Marysburg Assumption Church, originally built in 1921 the brick-clad church is of a Romanesque Revival style featuring two towers. The church can hold nearly 400 people and makes extensive use of stained glass. Thirty two paintings by the artist Berthold Imhoff were purchased in 1948 to decorate the church. The church building hosts the Marysburg Summer Festival of the Arts. 
A program to restore the historic church is in progress.

A sculpture in the village called The Watching Woman was completed in 2004.

Sports
Marysburg is also home to the Marysburg Royals Senior Baseball team that was established in 1918.  They play every summer on the beautiful ball diamond that sits just east of the Assumption Church.   2022 is the 104th consecutive season the tiny hamlet has fielded a senior baseball team. The team celebrated their 100th birthday during the summer of 2018 with almost 300 people returning to Marysburg for a reunion. They played in the North Central Baseball League from 1965 - 2003. They currently play in the Saskatoon Senior Baseball League. 
The teams has celebrated many championships over the years.

NCBL Pennant Winners - 1979, 1982, 1984, 1985, 1986, 1988, 1989, 1991, 1992, 1993, 1994, 1997, 1998, 1999, 2000, 2001, 2002, 2003
NCBL Champions - 1966, 1968, 1984, 1985, 1986, 1988, 1989, 1991, 1992, 1993, 1994, 1996, 1997, 1998, 1999, 2000, 2001, 2002, 2003

Saskatoon Senior Baseball League Pennant Winners - 2009, 2010, 2012, 2013, 2014, 2015, 2016, 2018, 2019, 2020, 2021

Saskatoon Senior Baseball League Champions - 2010

Baseball Saskatchewan Provincial Senior A Champs - 1998, 2003

Baseball Saskatchewan Provincial Senior AA Tier 1 Champs - 2011

Baseball Saskatchewan Team of the Year - 2011

For more info check out their website at www.ballcharts.com/marysburgroyals

Also check them out on Twitter @marysburgroyals

References

Humboldt No. 370, Saskatchewan
Unincorporated communities in Saskatchewan
Division No. 15, Saskatchewan